Drishti, or focused gaze, is a means for developing concentrated intention. It relates to the fifth limb of yoga, pratyahara, concerning sense withdrawal,  as well as the sixth limb, dharana, relating to concentration. 

In Ashtanga Vinyasa Yoga, each asana is associated with one of the 8 focused gazes, namely Angusthamadhye (thumb), Bhrumadhye (eyebrow), Nasagre (tip of nose), Hastagrahe (tips of hands), Parshva (side), Urdhva (up), Nabhicakre (navel), and Padayoragre (tips of feet) Drishtis. In some other styles such as Sivananda Yoga, less use is made of the gaze, and fewer types are employed.

History 

The Yoga Sutras of Patanjali define eight limbs of yoga but do not mention the gaze. The sixth limb, dharana (concentration), however requires holding one's mind onto an inner state, subject or topic. The mind can for example be fixed on a mantra, one's breath, or a part of the body such as the navel or the tip of the tongue. This is an internal concentration of attention, not a gaze.

In the Bhagavad Gita VI.13, Krishna instructs the hero Arjuna to "hold one's body and head erect in a straight line and stare steadily at the tip of the nose".

The 1737 Joga Pradīpikā uses the same two Drishtis, Nasagre and Bhrumadhye, requiring their use with each of the 84 asanas described in the text.

Modern 

Styles of modern yoga as exercise such as Ashtanga Vinyasa Yoga, Iyengar Yoga and Sivananda Yoga make differing uses of Drishtis.

In Ashtanga Vinyasa Yoga 

Each asana is associated in Ashtanga Vinyasa Yoga with a particular Drishti. There are eight Drishtis (counting the paired Parshva Drishtis on the left and right sides as one).

In Iyengar Yoga

Iyengar Yoga rarely speaks of Drishtis, but in its instructions for some asanas it tells the practitioner to look in a certain direction, for example upwards in Trikonasana and forwards in Virabhadrasana II.

In Sivananda Yoga 

Sivananda Yoga makes use of two Drishtis, namely Nāsāgre and Bhrūmadhye, for tratak exercise (a purification) rather than in asana practice. Vishnudevananda cautions that prolonged or incorrect practice may cause problems for the eye muscles or nervous system. Initial practice is often done for only minutes at a time, but is gradually increased to up to ten minute intervals.

References

Sources 

 
 
 
 
 
 
 
 
 
 
 

Hatha yoga
Yoga concepts